Tom Smith (born September 8, 1944) was the head men's basketball coach at Valparaiso University from 1980 until 1988. Smith played basketball at Horace Mann High School in Gary, Indiana and collegiately for Valparaiso. During his leadership, the Crusaders joined the AMCU in 1982. The 1983–1984 season was the first in Crusader history to appear in a conference tournament, losing to Western Illinois. His career record with the Crusaders was 84–138. Tom coached 25 of his 38 seasons at Missouri Western, where he compiled a 448–279 record. Smith coached the Griffons to 10 NCAA Division II national tournaments, five MIAA regular season championships and four MIAA postseason tournament titles. Smith has also been named MIAA Coach-of-the-year twice while he was at MWSU. Under Smith's guidance, Western has produced an MIAA Most valuable player, an MIAA tournament MVP, 45 All-MAA selections, six All-Region picks, and three NCAA All-Americans. He currently has a .586 overall winning percentage at the college level, ranking him in the top 20 active coaches, and also is the winningest coach in Missouri Western history.

Head coaching record at MWSU

References

1944 births
Living people
American men's basketball coaches
American men's basketball players
Basketball coaches from Michigan
Basketball players from Detroit
Central Missouri Mules basketball coaches
College men's basketball head coaches in the United States
Missouri Western Griffons men's basketball coaches
Sportspeople from Gary, Indiana
Valparaiso Beacons men's basketball coaches
Valparaiso Beacons men's basketball players
Basketball players from Gary, Indiana